IF Sylvia is a Swedish football club based in Norrköping. The club, formed on 19 May 1922, is currently playing in the third tier of Swedish football, Division 1. The club is affiliated to the Östergötlands Fotbollförbund.

In the early years, the club was also playing bandy and other sports.

In March 2013, IF Sylvia and IFK Norrköping started a cooperation where Sylvia will act as a nursery for youth player from IFK. Sylvia will also be able to loan players from IFK at short notice.

Achievements 
 Division 1 Södra:
 Winners (1): 2006
 Runners-up (1): 2011
 Division 2 Södra Svealand:
 Winners (1): 2018
 Division 2 Västra Svealand:
 Runners-up (2): 1994, 1997
 Division 3 Östra Svealand:
 Winners (1): 1993

Season to season 
{| 
|valign="top" width=0%|
{|  class="wikitable"
|- style="background:#f0f6fa;"
!Season
!Level
!Division
!Section
!Position
!Movements
|-
|style="background:#FF7F00;"|1993
|style="background:#FF7F00;"|Tier 4
|style="background:#FF7F00;"| Division 3
|style="background:#FF7F00;"| Östra Svealand
|style="background:#FF7F00;"|1st
|style="background:#FF7F00;"| Promoted
|-
|style="background:#77DD77;"|1994
|style="background:#77DD77;"|Tier 3
|style="background:#77DD77;"|Division 2
|style="background:#77DD77;"|Västra Svealand
|style="background:#77DD77;"|2nd|style="background:#77DD77;"|Promotion Playoffs
|-
|style="background:#77DD77;"|1995
|style="background:#77DD77;"|Tier 3
|style="background:#77DD77;"|Division 2|style="background:#77DD77;"|Västra Svealand
|style="background:#77DD77;"|4th|style="background:#77DD77;"|
|-
|style="background:#77DD77;"|1996
|style="background:#77DD77;"|Tier 3
|style="background:#77DD77;"|Division 2|style="background:#77DD77;"|Västra Svealand
|style="background:#77DD77;"|5th|style="background:#77DD77;"|
|-
|style="background:#77DD77;"|1997
|style="background:#77DD77;"|Tier 3
|style="background:#77DD77;"|Division 2|style="background:#77DD77;"|Västra Svealand
|style="background:#77DD77;"|2nd|style="background:#77DD77;"|Promotion Playoffs – Promoted
|-
|style="background:#87CEFA;"|1998
|style="background:#87CEFA;"|Tier 2
|style="background:#87CEFA;"|Division 1|style="background:#87CEFA;"|Södra
|style="background:#87CEFA;"| 3rd|style="background:#87CEFA;"|
|-
|style="background:#87CEFA;"|1999
|style="background:#87CEFA;"|Tier 2
|style="background:#87CEFA;"|Division 1|style="background:#87CEFA;"|Norra
|style="background:#87CEFA;"| 3rd|style="background:#87CEFA;"| 
|-
|style="background:#87CEFA;"|2000
|style="background:#87CEFA;"|Tier 2
|style="background:#87CEFA;"| Superettan|style="background:#87CEFA;"|
|style="background:#87CEFA;"| 9th|style="background:#87CEFA;"| 
|-
|style="background:#87CEFA;"|2001
|style="background:#87CEFA;"|Tier 2
|style="background:#87CEFA;"| Superettan|style="background:#87CEFA;"|
|style="background:#87CEFA;"| 7th|style="background:#87CEFA;"| 
|-
|style="background:#87CEFA;"|2002
|style="background:#87CEFA;"|Tier 2
|style="background:#87CEFA;"| Superettan|style="background:#87CEFA;"|
|style="background:#87CEFA;"| 13th|style="background:#87CEFA;"| 
|-
|style="background:#87CEFA;"|2003
|style="background:#87CEFA;"|Tier 2
|style="background:#87CEFA;"| Superettan|style="background:#87CEFA;"|
|style="background:#87CEFA;"| 16th|style="background:#87CEFA;"| Relegated
|-
|style="background:#77DD77;"|2004
|style="background:#77DD77;"|Tier 3
|style="background:#77DD77;"|Division 2|style="background:#77DD77;"|Västra Svealand
|style="background:#77DD77;"|4th|style="background:#77DD77;"|
|-
|style="background:#77DD77;"|2005
|style="background:#77DD77;"|Tier 3
|style="background:#77DD77;"|Division 2|style="background:#77DD77;"|Östra Svealand
|style="background:#77DD77;"|3rd|style="background:#77DD77;"|Promoted
|-
|style="background:#77DD77;"|2006*
|style="background:#77DD77;"|Tier 3
|style="background:#77DD77;"|Division 1|style="background:#77DD77;"|Södra
|style="background:#77DD77;"|1st|style="background:#77DD77;"|Promoted
|-
|style="background:#87CEFA;"|2007
|style="background:#87CEFA;"|Tier 2
|style="background:#87CEFA;"| Superettan|style="background:#87CEFA;"|
|style="background:#87CEFA;"| 16th|style="background:#87CEFA;"| Relegated
|-
|style="background:#77DD77;"|2008
|style="background:#77DD77;"|Tier 3
|style="background:#77DD77;"|Division 1|style="background:#77DD77;"|Norra
|style="background:#77DD77;"|9th|style="background:#77DD77;"|
|-
|style="background:#77DD77;"|2009
|style="background:#77DD77;"|Tier 3
|style="background:#77DD77;"|Division 1|style="background:#77DD77;"|Södra
|style="background:#77DD77;"|9th|style="background:#77DD77;"|
|-
|style="background:#77DD77;"|2010
|style="background:#77DD77;"|Tier 3
|style="background:#77DD77;"|Division 1|style="background:#77DD77;"|Södra
|style="background:#77DD77;"|3rd|style="background:#77DD77;"|
|-
|style="background:#77DD77;"|2011
|style="background:#77DD77;"|Tier 3
|style="background:#77DD77;"|Division 1|style="background:#77DD77;"|Södra
|style="background:#77DD77;"|2nd|style="background:#77DD77;"|Promotion Playoffs
|-
|style="background:#77DD77;"|2012
|style="background:#77DD77;"|Tier 3
|style="background:#77DD77;"|Division 1|style="background:#77DD77;"|Södra
|style="background:#77DD77;"|7th|style="background:#77DD77;"|
|-
|style="background:#77DD77;"|2013
|style="background:#77DD77;"|Tier 3
|style="background:#77DD77;"|Division 1|style="background:#77DD77;"|Södra
|style="background:#77DD77;"|7th|style="background:#77DD77;"|
|-
|style="background:#77DD77;"|2014
|style="background:#77DD77;"|Tier 3
|style="background:#77DD77;"|Division 1|style="background:#77DD77;"|Norra
|style="background:#77DD77;"|12th|style="background:#77DD77;"|Relegated
|-
|style="background:#FF7F00;"|2015
|style="background:#FF7F00;"|Tier 4
|style="background:#FF7F00;"| Division 2|style="background:#FF7F00;"| Södra Svealand
|style="background:#FF7F00;"|6th|style="background:#FF7F00;"|  
|-
|style="background:#FF7F00;"|2016
|style="background:#FF7F00;"|Tier 4
|style="background:#FF7F00;"| Division 2|style="background:#FF7F00;"| Södra Svealand
|style="background:#FF7F00;"|10th|style="background:#FF7F00;"| 
|-
|style="background:#FF7F00;"|2017
|style="background:#FF7F00;"|Tier 4
|style="background:#FF7F00;"| Division 2|style="background:#FF7F00;"| Södra Svealand
|style="background:#FF7F00;"|6th|style="background:#FF7F00;"|   
|-
|style="background:#FF7F00;"|2018
|style="background:#FF7F00;"|Tier 4
|style="background:#FF7F00;"| Division 2|style="background:#FF7F00;"| Södra Svealand
|style="background:#FF7F00;"|1st'''
|style="background:#FF7F00;"|Promoted   
|}* League restructuring in 2006 resulted in a new division being created at Tier 3 and subsequent divisions dropping a level. 
|}

 Attendances 

In recent seasons IF Sylvia have had the following average attendances:

 Records 
 Highest attendance, Idrottsparken: 11,114 vs. IFK Norrköping, 3 May 2007 (Final score, 1–2, in Superettan)

 Current squad 

Management
Technical staffAs of 4 January 2018''

Footnotes

External links 
IF Sylvia – Official site

Football clubs in Östergötland County
Association football clubs established in 1922
Bandy clubs established in 1922
Defunct bandy clubs in Sweden
Sport in Östergötland County
1922 establishments in Sweden